Cannabis in Cuba is illegal. Small amounts of possession are punishable by six months to two years in prison. "Cultivation, production, and transit" of large amounts of any illegal drug, including cannabis, results, in a sentence of four to twenty years. International trafficking of the same carries a sentence of, 15 to 30 years in prison or, in more severe cases, death.

History
Cannabis was introduced to Cuba as a textile crop in 1793, but planters on the island found sugarcane to be a more lucrative crop. 

In 1949, prior to the Cuban Revolution, a journal noted that most of the cannabis found in Cuba was imported from Mexico, but it was increasingly grown on the island, and was receiving attention in medical, juridical, and police publications.

Laws in Cuba for carrying drugs 

You can not use marijuana for medical or recreational use in Cuba.

If you feel like carrying cannabis on your Cuba trip, you must have a complete idea of their laws. Cannabis laws in Cuba are extremely strict, even for tourists. Cultivation or transit will also lead you to heavy penalties.

 Growing Cannabis and any form of transit can lead you 4 to 20 years in prison,
 International trafficking of these illegal drugs will take you 15 to 20 years in prison, and if you are found selling these drugs to minors, you may face the death penalty.

References

Cuba
Drugs in Cuba
Cuba
Cuba